"It's All in Your Mind" is a single by Beck, released in 1995. Although then a non-album single (being a 7" of outtakes from his album One Foot in the Grave), a later version was recorded and included on his album Sea Change (2002); this recording is more widely known.

The rerecording is the seventh track on Beck's 2002 album, Sea Change. It is perhaps one of the simplest songs on the album lyrically; many phrases are repeated, with 'I wanted to be' iterated nine times.

The song was rerecorded for Sea Change, because during one session, Hansen began strumming the song randomly before starting a new song, and producer Nigel Godrich became ecstatic, saying "We have to do that." The strikingly different re-recorded version released on Sea Change was described by Beck as an "evolved song".

The only song on Sea Change not to have been written following his break-up with Leigh Limon, "It's All in Your Mind" was recorded originally in mid-1993 for Beck's 1994 album, One Foot in the Grave, but Beck rejected it. Instead, he released it in 1995 on its own single, along with "Whiskey Can-Can" and "Feather in Your Cap", both of which were also One Foot outtakes. It was released again, this time in a live version from the Bridge School Concert of October 28, 1995.

"It's All in Your Mind" featured prominently in concerts between the years of 1994 and 1995, but largely disappeared until Beck rediscovered the song in 2002, while recording Sea Change. Godrich and Beck were both impressed enough with the old song to put it on the album. Unlike many of Beck's songs, the lyrics to "It's All in Your Mind" have stayed the same through time. However, Beck replaced the two-chord strumming of the 1993 song with a more intricate finger-picking.

Single
 "It's All in Your Mind"
 "Feather in Your Cap"
 "Whiskey Can-Can"

All three songs on the single were included on the Japanese version of One Foot in the Grave and on the 2009 reissue of the album.

External links
Whiskeyclone page

References

1993 songs
Beck songs
Song recordings produced by Nigel Godrich
1995 singles
Songs written by Beck